Boy of the Streets is a 1937 American drama film directed by William Nigh and written by Gilson Brown and Scott Darling. The film stars Jackie Cooper, Maureen O'Connor, Kathleen Burke, Robert Emmett O'Connor, Marjorie Main and Matty Fain. The film was released on December 8, 1937, by Monogram Pictures.

Plot

Cast          
Jackie Cooper as Chuck Brennan
Maureen O'Connor as Nora
Kathleen Burke as Julie Stone
Robert Emmett O'Connor as Police Officer Rourke
Marjorie Main as Mrs. Mary Brennan
Matty Fain as Blackie Davis
George Cleveland as Tim 'Flannel-Mouth' Farley
Wild Bill Elliott as Dr. Allan 
Guy Usher as Fog Horn Brennan 
Paul White as Spike

References

External links
 

1937 films
American drama films
1937 drama films
Monogram Pictures films
Films directed by William Nigh
American black-and-white films
1930s English-language films
1930s American films